Leila Sadykova (Leila Sadyqova; born 14 August 2002) is a Kazakhstani footballer who plays as a forward for Women's Championship club FC Okzhetpes and the Kazakhstan women's national team.

References

2002 births
Living people
Kazakhstani women's footballers
Women's association football forwards
Kazakhstan women's international footballers